The National Council of Chiefs is an assembly of traditional leaders throughout the Republic of Zimbabwe. The president and deputy president of the council are both members of the Senate of Zimbabwe since 2007, and the council appoints ten chiefs to the Senate; under a former constitution from 1980 to 1989, the council was charged with selecting members to the Senate.

Chapter 15 of the constitution of Zimbabwe recognises the institution, status and role of traditional leaders under customary law. A traditional leader is responsible for performing the cultural, customary and traditional functions of a Chief, headperson or village head, as the case may be, for his or her community. The National Council of Chiefs was constituted in accordance with an Act of Parliament, to represent all chiefs in Zimbabwe.

Chief Fortune Chirumbira of the Masvingo Province is the current council president, and Chief Lukas Mtshane Khumalo of Matabeleland North Province is his deputy. Due to this, both are members of the Senate - and will remain as such for the duration of their tenures in office.

See also 
 National House of Traditional Leaders of South Africa
 Council of Traditional Leaders of Namibia
 Ntlo ya Dikgosi of Botswana
 Senate of Lesotho

References

Government of Zimbabwe